The competition of the men's 3 metre springboard synchronized was held on June 2, the first day of the 2010 FINA Diving World Cup.

Results

Green denotes finalists

LEGEND

WDR = Withdrew

2010 FINA Diving World Cup